Frederick Douglas France Jr. (April 26, 1953 – April 8, 2016) was an American National Football League offensive lineman who played eight seasons for the Los Angeles Rams.

Football career

France attended and played football at Colonel White High School in Dayton, Ohio.

France played tight end for Ohio State (1971–74).

France was drafted in the first round as the 20th pick in the 1975 NFL Draft by the Los Angeles Rams after the team selected Dennis Harrah with the 11th pick. France played for the Los Angeles Rams for seven years and went to the Pro Bowl  for two straight years (1977–78). Then France spent one season with the Houston Oilers in 1983.

After retiring from the NFL he attempted to become an actor before becoming a high school offensive line coach at La Quinta High School, Westminster, CA. He died on April 8, 2016 in Las Vegas, Nevada.

References

External links

1953 births
2016 deaths
Players of American football from Dayton, Ohio
American football offensive tackles
Ohio State Buckeyes football players
Los Angeles Rams players
Houston Oilers players
National Conference Pro Bowl players